The Downtown Plant City Historic Residential District is a U.S. historic district (designated as such on August 12, 1998) located in Plant City, Florida. The district is bounded by North Drane, Thomas, West Tever, Franklin, and Carey Streets. It contains 185 historic buildings.

See also
Downtown Plant City Commercial District

References

External links
 Hillsborough County listings at National Register of Historic Places

National Register of Historic Places in Hillsborough County, Florida
Historic districts on the National Register of Historic Places in Florida
Plant City, Florida